André Lange (born 28 June 1973) is a retired German bobsledder and one of the most successful bob pilots of all time. Competing at the 2002, 2006 and 2010 Winter Olympics, he has won four gold and one silver medals. Lange originally started his sledding career as a luger, taking up bobsleigh in 1993.

At the 2002 Winter Olympics, Lange won the four-man event with teammates Carsten Embach, Enrico Kühn and Kevin Kuske. At the 2006 Winter Olympics, Lange also won gold in the four-man event with teammates Kevin Kuske, René Hoppe and Martin Putze, in addition to winning the two-man event with Kuske. He competed in the 2010 Winter Olympics, winning gold in the two-man and silver in the four-man events.

Lange also won fourteen medals at the FIBT World Championships with eight golds (Two-man: 2003, 2007, 2008; Four-man: 2000, 2003, 2004, 2005, 2008), four silvers (Two-man: 2000, 2005; Four-man: 2001, 2009), and two bronzes (Two-man: 2004, Four-man: 2007).

At the Bobsleigh World Cup level, he has won three combined men's championships (2000-1, 2002–3, 2003–4), one two-man championship (2007–08), and four four-man championships (2000-1, 2002–3, 2003–4, 2007–8).

In April 2014 it was announced that Lange would become the head of the Thuringian Winter Sports Centre in Oberhof, which includes the DKB Ski Arena, the Oberhof sledding track, the Kanzlersgrund ski jumps and the town's indoor ski area, following the retirement of the previous head Wolfgang Filbrich that July. In May 2017 he announced that he was leaving this role. In August 2017 the Korea Luge Federation announced that Lange would join the South Korean luge team as a coach in October on a five-month contract to assist head coach Steffen Sartor to help prepare them for the 2018 Winter Olympics in Pyongchang, South Korea.

References

External links

Bobsleigh four-man Olympic medalists for 1924, 1932–56, and since 1964
Bobsleigh two-man world championship medalists since 1931
Bobsleigh four-man world championship medalists since 1930
List of combined men's bobsleigh World Cup champions: 1985–2007
List of four-man bobsleigh World Cup champions since 1985
List of two-man bobsleigh World Cup champions since 1985

1973 births
Living people
People from Ilmenau
People from Bezirk Suhl
German male bobsledders
Sportspeople from Thuringia
German sports coaches
Olympic bobsledders of Germany
Bobsledders at the 2002 Winter Olympics
Bobsledders at the 2006 Winter Olympics
Bobsledders at the 2010 Winter Olympics
Olympic gold medalists for Germany
Olympic silver medalists for Germany
Olympic medalists in bobsleigh
Medalists at the 2010 Winter Olympics
Medalists at the 2006 Winter Olympics
Medalists at the 2002 Winter Olympics
Recipients of the Silver Laurel Leaf